Nunukul (Nununkul, Nunugal), or Munjan (Moonjan)(Meanjin), is an extinct language of Queensland in Australia.

Vocabulary 
Some words from the Nunukul / Munjan  language, as spelt and written by Nunukul / Munjan authors include:

 Gooboora: the Silent Pool
 Oodgeroo: paperbark tree
 Woor: devil / evil being

References 

Durubalic languages
Extinct languages of Queensland